Fresno is a California High-Speed Rail station being constructed in Fresno, California.  The first purpose-built high speed rail station in the United States, it is part of the system's Initial Construction Segment. The facility is located in Downtown Fresno at H Street between Fresno and Tulare Streets, and is being built as an expansion of the adjacent historic Fresno Southern Pacific Depot.

The station is about 7 blocks south from the existing Fresno Amtrak station. The high-speed rail line runs along the right-of-way of the Union Pacific Railroad at this location.

History

Southern Pacific Railroad

The station was established in April 1872 by the Central Pacific Railroad. The railroad built a simple wood frame depot on the site.

By 1888 the station had come under the ownership of Southern Pacific (SP), who wished to expand the facility. The City of Fresno rejected initial plans for a new station building, forcing SP to redesign and submit a new blueprint in the Queen Anne style of architecture, one of two such stations in California. The new Depot opened in October 1889 and consolidated much of the company's freight operations in the Valley.

Expansions and remodels occurred in the 1900s: more freight space was added on the south side of the building some time between 1914 and 1929, office were built on the north side in 1930, and the waiting room was remodeled in 1945. The Depot hosted named trains such as the Sacramento Daylight and San Joaquin Daylight. 

The station was closed on May 1, 1971, as Amtrak assumed most intercity rail operations in the United States and the Central Valley was left out of the initial system.

The station was added to the National Register of Historic Places on March 21, 1978. It is additionally listed on the City of Fresno Local Register of Historic Resources.

California High-Speed Rail
The groundbreaking ceremony for the California High-Speed Rail system was held at the station site on January 6, 2015.  In July 2015, it was estimated that construction of the station building itself would commence in 2017 or 2018 and was expected to spur new development in Downtown Fresno. In October 2016, the plans called for the station to occupy about 120,000 square feet and cost about $80 million, with the planning work being finished by the end of 2019.

Several existing industrial and office buildings in the vicinity had to be demolished to make way for the station and tracks. At the end of January 2017, demolition was begun on a former Greyhound bus terminal dating from the 1950s that occupied the site of the future high-speed rail station.

References

External links
 Fresno Station - California High-Speed 
 Fresno Station District

Proposed California High-Speed Rail stations
Railway stations in Fresno County, California
Railway stations scheduled to open in 2029
Railway stations in the United States opened in 1872
Railway stations in the United States opened in 1889
Railway stations closed in 1971
Fresno
National Register of Historic Places in Fresno County, California
Railway stations on the National Register of Historic Places in California